Bretherton is a civil parish in the Borough of Chorley, Lancashire, England.   The parish contains 19 buildings that are recorded in the National Heritage List for England as designated listed buildings. Of these, two are listed at Grade II*, the middle grade, and the others are at Grade II, the lowest grade.  Apart from the village of Bretherton, the parish is rural.  Most of the listed buildings are, or originated as, farmhouses or farm buildings.  The other listed buildings include a medieval cross base, two historic houses, a cottages, a former school a converted windmill, a church, a rectory, and a war memorial

Key

Buildings

References

Citations

Sources

Lists of listed buildings in Lancashire
Buildings and structures in the Borough of Chorley